The following is a list of the taxa described in the Bulletin de la Société Sciences Nat. The Bulletin de la Société Sciences Nat published 83 issues between 1972 and 1995.

List of taxa 
Taxon names are followed by the last names of the authors and the issue and page references. The publications dates are listed below.

Coleoptera (beetles)

 Acridoschema allardi Téocchi, 62, p. 26
 Acridoschema ligata tanzanicola Téocchi, 62, p. 26
 Actenodes aphrodite Bleuzen, 62, p. 11
 Actenodes biarti Bleuzen, 62, p. 9
 Actenodes brasiliensis Bleuzen, 62, p. 10
 Actenodes durantonorum Bleuzen, 62, p. 9
 Actenodes florencae Bleuzen, 62, p. 11
 Actenodes garleppi Bleuzen, 62, p. 12
 Actenodes hahlneli Bleuzen, 62, p. 11
 Actenodes hermes Bleuzen, 62, p. 11
 Actenodes lestradei Bleuzen, 62, p. 9
 Actenodes lestradei amazonensis Bleuzen, 62, p. 9
 Actenodes mars Bleuzen, 62, p. 10
 Actenodes mathani Bleuzen, 62, p. 11
 Actenodes minutus Bleuzen, 62, p. 10
 Actenodes mniszechi Bleuzen, 62, p. 10
 Actenodes muhlei Bleuzen, 62, p. 9
 Actenodes oberthuri Bleuzen, 62, p. 10
 Actenodes orvoeni Bleuzen, 62, p. 10
 Actenodes rugofrontalis Bleuzen, 62, p. 12
 Actenodes signatus mexicanus Bleuzen, 62, p. 10
 Actenodes staudingeri Bleuzen, 62, p. 11
 Actenodes subobscurus Bleuzen, 62, p. 10
 Actenodes venus Bleuzen, 62, p. 11
 Aderpas pauper unicolor Téocchi, 60, p. 27
 Aegus bisacutus Bomans & Bartolozzi, 63, p. 27
 Agestrata arnaudi Allard, 67, p. 24
 Agrilus rilliardi Baudon, 58, p. 27
 Allardiana Rigout, 82, p. 39
 Amaurodes passerini dukei Allard, 46, p. 16
 Amaurodes passerini natalensis Allard, 74, p. 11
 Analleucosma allardi Antoine, 64, p. 5
 Anochilia (Dysephicta) viossati Antoine, 75-76, p. 6
 Anristobia freneyi Schmitt, 75-76, p. 28
 Aparescus praecox ferreroi Téocchi, 64, p. 19
 Aphelorrhina bella insulanus Allard, 59, p. 26
 Aphelorrhina similima hecqi Allard, 43, p. 8
 Aphelorrhina tibialis adelphoides Allard, 43, p. 8
 Aphelorrhina tibialis collinsi Allard, 43, p. 8
 Apomecyna paraguttifera polyguttifera Téocchi, 71, p. 9
 Apoplesius Deuve, 66, p. 25
 Argyripa moroni Arnaud, 56, p. 27
 Argyripa porioni Arnaud, 56, p. 27
 Astraea (Astraea) alaini Antoine, 75-76, p. 30
 Astraea (Astraea) boudanti Antoine, 75-76, p. 30
 Astraea (Astraea) cartereti Arnaud, 53, p. 4
 Astraea (Astraea) dumasi Antoine, 75-76, p. 30
 Astraea (Astraea) miksici Antoine, 75-76, p. 30
 Astraea (Euglypta) lumawigi Arnaud, 56, p. 27 puis 66, p. 8
 Auriolus presidentialis ivorensis Téocchi, 72, p. 9
 Australognathus Chalumeau & Brochier, 79, p. 16
 Balesthoides guttipennis bonatoi Téocchi, 74, p. 12
 Batocera celebiana pierrotae Rigout, 82, p. 4
 Batocera lamondi Rigout, 54, p. 26
 Batocera porioni Rigout, 55, p. 10
 Beckius Dechambre, 75-76, p. 26
 Berningerus gorilloides Téocchi, 55, p. 26
 Biobesoides Téocchi, 72, p. 13
 Biobesoides pujoli Téocchi, 72, p. 13
 Biobesoides pujoli claricollis Téocchi, 72, p. 13
 Bomansodus Chalumeau & Brochier, 83, p. 20
 Callipogon (Orthomegas) fragosoi Bleuzen, 79, p. 19
 Callipogon (Orthomegas) haxairei Bleuzen, 79, p. 19
 Callipogon (Orthomegas) marechali Bleuzen, 79, p. 18
 Callipogon (Orthomegas) monnei Bleuzen, 79, p. 18
 Calodema bifasciata Sainval & Lander, 79, p. 7
 Calodema mariettae Lander, 79, p. 8
 Calodema micheleae Lamond & Werner, 83, p. 25
 Carabus (Acoptolabrus) businsky Deuve, 67, p. 2
 Carabus (Acoptolabrus) colasellus Deuve, 66, p. 26
 Carabus (Acoptolabrus) leechi auvrayorum Deuve, 77, p. 37
 Carabus (Acoptolabrus) leechi chonmasanensis Deuve, 80, p. 20
 Carabus (Acoptolabrus) leechi yooni Deuve, 67, p. 26
 Carabus (Acoptolabrus) mirabilissimus igniferescens Deuve, 74, p. 8
 Carabus (Acoptolabrus) schrenckii Deuve, 67, p. 28
 Carabus (Acoptolabrus) tonkinensis Deuve, 65, p. 26
 Carabus (Alipaster) bayanbulak Deuve, 79, p. 12
 Carabus (Alipaster) infantulus naraticus Deuve, 79, p. 13
 Carabus (Alipaster) pupulus dissimulatoides Deuve, 73, p. 26
 Carabus (Alipaster) pupulus inylchekensis Deuve, 69, p. 4
 Carabus (Alipaster) pupulus przewalskensis Deuve, 73, p. 24
 Carabus (Apoplesius) legrandi Deuve, 70, p. 20
 Carabus (Apotomopterus) arrowi tailoensis Deuve, 83, p. 34
 Carabus (Apotomopterus) bousquetianus Deuve, 82, p. 24
 Carabus (Apotomopterus) casaleianus Deuve, 80, p. 15
 Carabus (Apotomopterus) casaleianus thilliezi Deuve, 81, p. 33
 Carabus (Apotomopterus) delavayi habaensis Deuve, 75-76, p. 52
 Carabus (Apotomopterus) infirmior homodynamus Deuve, 82, p. 26
 Carabus (Apotomopterus) lamarcki Deuve, 82, p. 23
 Carabus (Apotomopterus) ngi Deuve, 82, p. 25
 Carabus (Apotomopterus) longeantennatus antaiensis Deuve, 82, p. 25
 Carabus (Apotomopterus) solidior parvielongatus Deuve, 82, p. 24
 Carabus (Apotomopterus) yuae arlequinus Deuve, 82, p. 25
 Carabus (Apotomopterus) yuanbaoensis Deuve, 82, p. 23
 Carabus (Apotomopterus) yunkaicus fageticola Deuve, 82, p. 26
 Carabus (Aulonocarabus) koreanus kwonileeique Deuve, 73, p. 18
 Carabus (Aulonocarabus) marcilhaci Deuve, 75-76, p. 52
 Carabus (Aulonocarabus) vogtianus horvatovichi Deuve, 74, p. 7
 Carabus (Axinocarabus) fedtschenkoi kugitangensis Deuve, 80, p. 23
 Carabus (Calocarabus) gratus nishidai Deuve, 80, p. 23
 Carabus (Calocarabus) linxiaensis Deuve, 75-76, p. 55
 Carabus (Calocarabus) linxiaensis pseudogratus Deuve, 82, p. 32
 Carabus (Carabus) arvensis jurgitae Deuve, 78, p. 5
 Carabus (Carabus) dongchuanicus Deuve, 82, p. 28
 Carabus (Carabus) giacomazzoi Deuve, 73, p. 17
 Carabus (Carabus) manifestus paeninsularis Deuve, 73, p. 17
 Carabus (Carabus) nanpingens Deuve, 73, p. 22
 Carabus (Carabus) pseudolatipennis wenxianensis Deuve, 75-76, p. 52
 Carabus (Carabus) stenbergi ronkayi Deuve, 74, p. 7
 Carabus (Carabus) yunnanus oblongior Deuve, 75-76, p. 52
 Carabus (Carabus) yunnanus pseudoyunnanus Deuve, 80, p. 16
 Carabus (Chrysocarabus) auronitens auronitens auverloti Thibaudeau, 40, p. 2
 Carabus (Chrysocarabus) auronitens auronitens rubicundosus Branger, 52, p. 3
 Carabus (Chrysocarabus) auronitens auronitens thumseri Thibaudeau, 40, p. 2
 Carabus (Chrysocarabus) auronitens festivus cyanonigrescens Devecis, 69, p. 18
 Carabus (Chrysocarabus) auronitens subfestivus coatlochensis Branger, 52, p. 4
 Carabus (Chrysocarabus) auronitens subfestivus igneus Branger, 52, p. 3
 Carabus (Chrysocarabus) auronitens subfestivus nigrescens Branger, 52, p. 3
 Carabus (Chrysocarabus) lineatus lateralis leonensis Brañes, 47, p. 6
 Carabus (Chrysocarabus) lineatus lateralis sanabriensis Brañes, 47, p. 5
 Carabus (Chrysocarabus) lineatus lateralis subsalmanyinus Brañes, 47, p. 6
 Carabus (Chrysotribax) hispanus retaudis Gorrin, 73, p. 16
 Carabus (Chrysotribax) rutilans helenais Mollard, 75-76, p. 25
 Carabus (Chrysotribax) rutilans jeannei lassalei Brañes, 47, p. 7
 Carabus (Coptolabrus) ignimetallus ngyukmingi Deuve, 69, p. 6
 Carabus (Coptolabrus) ishizukai Deuve & Ohshima, 63, p. 8
 Carabus (Coptolabrus) kubani Deuve, 67, p. 1
 Carabus (Coptolabrus) pustulifer guizhouensis Deuve, 82, p. 32
 Carabus (Coptolabrus) smaragdinus dolichognathus Deuve, 83, p. 34
 Carabus (Cratocarabus) kryzkanovskii grumulifer Deuve, 79, p. 13
 Carabus (Cratocarabus) kryzkanovskii laevimolossulus Deuve, 79, p. 13
 Carabus (Cratocarabus) kryzkanovskii molossulus Deuve, 79, p. 13
 Carabus (Cratocechenus) akinini buffi Deuve & Kaláb, 74, p. 10
 Carabus (Cratocechenus) akinini severovi Deuve, 74, p. 7
 Carabus (Cratocechenus) ovtchinnikovi kafkai Deuve, 81, p. 33
 Carabus (Cyclocarabus) martynovi pseudokaratavensis Deuve, 80, p. 23
 Carabus (Cyclocarabus) sidzhakensis Deuve, 69, p. 4
 Carabus (Cyclocarabus) uzbek Deuve & Kaláb, 74, p. 9
 Carabus (Diocarabus) kolymensis viridicupreior Deuve, 77, p. 37
 Carabus (Eocechenus) mouthiezianoides Deuve & Kaláb, 75-76, p. 61
 Carabus (Eotribax) malkovskyi erenhebergaensis Deuve, 79, p. 14
 Carabus (Eotribax) foreli rueckbeilianus Deuve, 80, p. 18
 Carabus (Eotribax) reperiendus Deuve, 73, p. 24
 Carabus (Eotribax) siniaevi Deuve, 80, p. 18
 Carabus (Eotribax) talgarensis Deuve, 70, p. 13
 Carabus (Eucarabus) deyrollei chloromorphus Brañes, 47, p. 7
 Carabus (Eucarabus) deyrollei cyaneomorphus Brañes, 47, p. 7
 Carabus (Eucarabus) deyrollei goryi Brañes, 47, p. 7
 Carabus (Eucarabus) deyrollei miniresplendens Brañes, 47, p. 7
 Carabus (Eucarabus) deyrollei neotristis Brañes, 47, p. 7
 Carabus (Eucarabus) deyrollei pecoudi Brañes, 47, p. 7
 Carabus (Eucarabus) deyrollei splendidulus Brañes, 47, p. 7
 Carabus (Eucarabus) gossarei venustoides Deuve, 65, p. 26
 Carabus (Eucarabus) kolymensis magadamensis Deuve, 72, p. 22
 Carabus (Eucarabus) parvicornis Deuve, 64, p. 14
 Carabus (Eucarabus) vinokurovi Deuve, 72, p. 21
 Carabus (Eucarabus) vinokurovi tsylbulskii Deuve, 72, p. 21
 Carabus (Goniocarabus) grombczewskii crassec ostulatus Deuve, 70, p. 18
 Carabus (Goniocarabus) grombczewskii mikhailovianus Deuve & Dolin, 78, p. 10
 Carabus (Heterocarabus) marietti charetianus Auvray, 74, p. 20
 Carabus (Ischnocarabus) tenuitarsis auvrayi Charet, 74, p. 21
 Carabus (Isiocarabus) dreuxi Deuve, 82, p. 26
 Carabus (Isiocarabus) kiukiangensis alzonai Deuve, 66, p. 25
 Carabus (Isiocarabus) kiukiangensis pustululatus Deuve, 79, p. 9
 Carabus (Isiocarabus) pustululatus Deuve, 82, p. 27
 Carabus (Lamprostus) hemprichi cheikhermonensis Deuve, 73, p. 26
 Carabus (Lamprostus) jitkae ehdenensis Deuve, 73, p. 27
 Carabus (Lamprostus) rabaroni dominici Thomé, 54, p. 23
 Carabus (Lamprostus) rabaroni rigouti Basquin & Darge, 52, p. 20
 Carabus (Lamprostus) syrus cheikensis Deuve, 73, p. 26
 Carabus (Lamprostus) syrus saidaensis Deuve, 73, p. 26
 Carabus (Lamprostus) torosus reynieri Charet, 74, p. 21
 Carabus (Leptocarabus) nangnimicus pukwonensis Deuve, 77, p. 37
 Carabus (Leptocarabus) nangnimicus pukwonensis Deuve, 77, p. 37
 Carabus (Leptoplesius) dolini Deuve, 73, p. 24
 Carabus (Leptoplesius) kirgisiensis juzai Deuve, 73, p. 22
 Carabus (Leptoplesius) kirgisiensis sarydiazensis Deuve, 73, p. 24
 Carabus (Leptoplesius) marquardti longioripes Deuve, 79, p. 14
 Carabus (Leptoplesius) marquardti problematicior Deuve, 80, p. 18
 Carabus (Leptoplesius) merzbacheri khotanensis sarydiazensis Deuve, 73, p. 24
 Carabus (Leptoplesius) nivium lanzhouicus Deuve, 61, p. 23
 Carabus (Leptoplesius) shokalskii kuqaensis Deuve, 80, p. 17
 Carabus (Macrothorax) rugosus baeticus pseudobaeticus Brañes, 47, p. 6
 Carabus (Macrothorax) rugosus branni semicyanescens Brañes, 47, p. 6
 Carabus (Meganebrius) aianstivelli Morvan, 29-30, p. 15
 Carabus (Meganebrius) tamang probsti Deuve, 70, p. 18
 Carabus (Megodontus) bonvouloiri casalei Cavazzuti, p. 50, p. 6
 Carabus (Megodontus) purpurascens monnayensis Branger, 52, p. 4
 Carabus (Megodontus) taliensis atentsensis Deuve, 66, p. 26
 Carabus (Megodontus) taliensis lijiangensis Deuve, 67, p. 2
 Carabus (Megodontus) taliensis weibaoensis Deuve, 75-76, p. 58
 Carabus (Megodontus) taliensis xueshanicola Deuve, 75-76, p. 59
 Carabus (Megodontus) yulongxuensis Deuve, 67, p. 2
 Carabus (Morphocarabus) latreilli pyonganensis Deuve & Li, 81, p. 34
 Carabus (Morphocarabus) monilis amoenus lavagni Lavagne & Fleurent, 82, p. 39
 Carabus (Morphocarabus) monilis monilis vincentianus Devecis, 70, p. 25
 Carabus (Morphocarabus) molinis roseyanus Dufour, 15, p. 14
 Carabus (Ohomopterus) battoniensis Deuve, 69, p. 3
 Carabus (Ohomopterus) ohshimaorum Deuve, 69, p. 3
 Carabus (Ophiocarabus) kalabellus Deuve, 79, p. 10
 Carabus (Ophiocarabus) politus naratensis Deuve, 79, p. 10
 Carabus (Ophiocarabus) rufocuprescens chormaensis Deuve, 80, p. 17
 Carabus (Oreocarabus) cribatus negreianus Deuve, 80, p. 17
 Carabus (Oreocarabus) guadarramus guadarramus sagranus Brañes, 47, p. 5
 Carabus (Oreocarabus) porrectangulus ispiriacus Deuve, 78, p. 7
 Carabus (Oreocarabus) titanus corpulentior Deuve, 66, p. 25
 Carabus (Pagocarabus) krali Deuve, 82, p. 31
 Carabus (Pagocarabus) lama daochengensis Deuve, 82, p. 31
 Carabus (Pagocarabus) lama derongensis Deuve, 82, p. 31
 Carabus (Pagocarabus) lama yajiangensis Deuve, 82, p. 31
 Carabus (Pagocarabus) nanschanicus nocticolor Deuve & Kaláb, 75-76, p. 62
 Carabus (Procerus) cerkes Basquin & Darge, 52, p. 21
 Carabus (Procerus) scabrosus weidneri Lassalle, 63, p. 3
 Carabus (Pseudocranion) alpherakii mugeko Deuve, 73, p. 18
 Carabus (Pseudocranion) bruggeianus Deuve, 73, p. 20
 Carabus (Pseudocranion) budha meditabundus Deuve, 73, p. 21
 Carabus (Pseudocranion) dilacerans Deuve, 75-76, p. 56
 Carabus (Pseudocranion) gansuensis labrangicus Deuve, 75-76, p. 56
 Carabus (Pseudocranion) gansuensis luhuoensis Deuve, 82, p. 32
 Carabus (Pseudocranion) gansuensis viatorum Deuve, 75-76, p. 56
 Carabus (Pseudocranion) tagongensis Deuve, 73, p. 18
 Carabus (Pseudocranion) tiro gerardchareti Deuve, 79, p. 12
 Carabus (Rhigocarabus) alpherakii budha Deuve, 79, p. 11
 Carabus (Rhigocarabus) alpherakii chareti Deuve, 79, p. 11
 Carabus (Rhigocarabus) brezinai Deuve, 82, p. 30
 Carabus (Rhigocarabus) jiulongensis Deuve, 82, p. 29
 Carabus (Rhigocarabus) pusio hylonomus Deuve, 73, p. 17
 Carabus (Rhigocarabus) laevithorax pecoudianus Deuve, 73, p. 17
 Carabus (Rhigocarabus) subindigestus Deuve, 82, p. 30
 Carabus (Rhigocarabus) tewoensis Deuve, 75-76, p. 54
 Carabus (Rhigocarabus) turnai Deuve, 82, p. 28
 Carabus (Rhigocarabus) xiangchengicus Deuve, 79, p. 10
 Carabus (Rhigocarabus) xiei barkamensis Deuve, 82, p. 30
 Carabus (Sphodristocarabus) armenianicus sarikamisensis Cavazzuti, p. 50, p. 4
 Carabus (Sphodristocarabus) gilnickii brunneicupreus Deuve, 80, p. 20
 Carabus (Sphodristocarabus) macrogonus azaleae Cavazzuti, p. 50, p. 3
 Carabus (Sphodristocarabus) macrogonus giresunensis Deuve, 75-76, p. 55
 Carabus (Tomocarabus) rumelicus kurdistanicola Deuve, 64, p. 15
 Carabus (Tomocarabus) simardianus Deuve, 64, p. 14
 Carabus (Trachycarabus) hemicalosoma gonbadensis Deuve, 69, p. 4
 Carabus (Tribax) puschkini kabacaensis Machard, 74, p. 21
 Ceroglossus darwini caburgansis Deuve, 64, p. 14
 Ceroglossus darwini jirouxi Deuve, 83, p. 11
 Chariesthes nobilis septempunctata Téocchi, 57, p. 17
 Cheirotonus chiangdaoensis Minet, 53, p. 3
 Chelorrhina kraatzi marlenae Rousset, 64, p. 22
 Chiasornithodus Chalumeau & Brochier, 83, p. 20
 Chrysobothris joellae Bleuzen, 77, p. 35
 Chrysochroa akiyamai Bleuzen, 64, p. 2
 Chrysochroa blairi Bleuzen, 64, p. 2
 Clerota rodriguezi Arnaud, 46, p. 18
 Clinteroides lachaumei Antoine, 75-76, p. 14
 Coelodera miksici Antoine, 49, p. 18
 Coelorrhina babaulti Allard, 36, p. 5
 Coelorrhina hornimanni lerui Allard, 78, p. 4
 Coelorrhina hornimanni nathaliae Allard, 59, p. 26
 Coelorrhina hornimanni vingerhoedti Allard, 78, p. 5
 Coelorrhina loricata ruandana Allard, 36, p. 3
 Coelorrhina ruficeps collinsi Allard, 36, p. 4
 Coelorrhina ruficeps elgonensis Allard, 36, p. 4
 Coelorrhina ruteri Allard, 36, p. 5
 Coptomia viossati Antoine, 75-76, p. 7
 Coptomiopsis viossati Antoine, 75-76, p. 7
 Coryphocera khooi Arnaud, 64, p. 23
 Cosmiophaena minor sylvatica Antoine, 54, p. 20
 Cychrus angustitarsalis Deuve, 70, p. 17
 Cychrus barkamensis Deuve, 72, p. 20
 Cychrus barkamensis siguniangensis Deuve, 80, p. 21
 Cychrus bispinosus wuduensis Deuve, 80, p. 21
 Cychrus bruggei Deuve, 70, p. 17
 Cychrus chareti Deuve, 80, p. 20
 Cychrus chareti shankoucola Deuve, 82, p. 32
 Cychrus colasi Deuve, 80, p. 21
 Cychrus furumii mauxi Deuve, 69, p. 6
 Cychrus kubani Deuve, 75-76, p. 60
 Cychrus luhuo Deuve, 82, p. 33
 Cychrus marcilhaci Deuve, 75-76, p. 59
 Cychrus mugecuo Deuve, 80, p. 21
 Cychrus pratti sabdensis Deuve, 82, p. 33
 Cychrus roeschkei jiulongensis Deuve, 82, p. 33
 Cychrus turnai Deuve, 82, p. 33
 Cychrus yulongxuicus Deuve, 67, p. 3
 Cychropsis bousqueti Deuve, 72, p. 19
 Cyclocephala bleuzeni Dechambre, 83, p. 12
 Cyclocephala pardolocarnoi Dechambre, 83, p. 12
 Cyclocephala sylviae Dechambre, 83, p. 13
 Cyclommatus martinii Lacroix, 61, p. 25
 Cyclommatus monguillonni Lacroix 29-30, p. 55
 Cyclommatus strigiceps ipseni Lacroix, 59, p. 6
 Cyclommatus tittoni Lacroix 38, p. 6
 Cymatura holonigra longipilis Téocchi, 63, p. 12
 Cymatura spumans intermedia Téocchi, 74, p. 13
 Daedycorrhina donckieri pallida Allard, 68, p. 23
 Daedycorrhina rigouti flavipennis Allard, 68, p. 23
 Daedycorrhina rondoensis Allard, 58, p. 17
 Daedycorrhina songeana Allard, 58, p. 17
 Dichostates compactus namibianus Téocchi, 74, p. 14
 Discopeltis bellula cinctipennis Antoine, 79, p. 23
 Dynastes hercules paschoali Grossi & Arnaud, 78, p. 13
 Dyspilophora trivittata insularis Allard, 74, p. 11
 Ecyroschema tuberculata hecphora Téocchi, 57, p. 20
 Embrikiola simulans gabonica Bleuzen, 67, p. 8
 Eudicella gralli thiryi Allard, 78, p. 5
 Eudicella immaculata quadrimaculata Allard, 78, p. 4
 Eudicella intermedia Allard, 47, p. 2
 Eudicella woermanni nathaliae Allard, 59, p. 26
 Eunidia allardi koczkai Téocchi, 64, p. 20
 Eunidia fuscostictica evansi Téocchi, 60, p. 26
 Eunidia nigrosignata marinii Téocchi, 64, p. 20
 Eunidia ochreomarmorata pallida Téocchi, 60, p. 25
 Eunidia tubericollis latefasciata Téocchi, 74, p. 13
 Eupatorus koletta Voirin, 19, p. 6
 Euselates delponti Antoine, 56, p. 22
 Euselates neglecta Antoine, 49, p. 18
 Euselates perroti Antoine, 64, p. 9
 Euselates virgata pauliani Antoine, 49, p. 18
 Falsapomecyna mourgliae Téocchi, 57, p. 18
 Figulus angustus Bomans, 63, p. 15
 Figulus bicolor Bomans, 51, p. 10
 Figulus boileaui Bomans, 51, p. 10
 Figulus cavifrons Bomans, 53, p. 6
 Figulus crupsinus Bomans, 53, p. 9
 Figulus deletus Bomans, 63, p. 18
 Figulus delicatus Bomans, 52, p. 11
 Figulus elateroides Bomans, 51, p. 10
 Figulus excavatus Bomans, 52, p. 11
 Figulus exquisitus Bomans, 53, p. 6
 Figulus fulgens Bomans, 52, p. 8
 Figulus granulosus Bomans, 51, p. 11
 Figulus hornabrooki Bomans, 52, p. 12
 Figulus incertus Bomans, 53, p. 5
 Figulus incisus Bomans, 52, p. 7
 Figulus insolitus Bomans, 53, p. 10
 Figulus insulanus Bomans, 52, p. 7
 Figulus joliveti Bomans, 51, p. 11
 Figulus kinabaluensis Bomans, 53, p. 13
 Figulus laevithorax Bomans, 53, p. 6
 Figulus laoticus Bomans, 51, p. 11
 Figulus meridianus Bomans, 51, p. 12
 Figulus orientalis Bomans, 63, p. 19
 Figulus parallelicanthus Bomans, 63, p. 17
 Figulus parvus Bomans, 53, p. 10
 Figulus piceus Bomans, 63, p. 15
 Figulus planifrons Bomans, 53, p. 6
 Figulus popei Bomans, 52, p. 8
 Figulus porrectus Bomans, 63, p. 18
 Figulus powelli Bomans, 51, p. 12
 Figulus praecipus Bomans, 53, p. 10
 Figulus procericornis Bomans, 53, p. 13
 Figulus punctifrons Bomans, 53, p. 9
 Figulus quasisimils Bomans, 63, p. 16
 Figulus robustus Bomans, 52, p. 8
 Figulus rubripes Bomans, 53, p. 5
 Figulus sarawakensis Bomans, 53, p. 9
 Figulus similis Bomans, 53, p. 5
 Figulus spinosus Bomans, 52, p. 8
 Figulus splendens Bomans, 52, p. 11
 Figulus tapinus Bomans, 52, p. 7
 Figulus tubericollis Bomans, 63, p. 16
 Figulus tumidimentum Bomans, 63, p. 18
 Figulus venustus Bomans, 63, p. 16
 Figulus weinreichei Bomans, 51, p. 15
 Figulus wittmeri Bomans & Lacroix, 61, p. 24
 Freocoroides Téocchi, 72, p. 12
 Freocoroides copei Téocchi, 72, p. 12
 Genyodonta laeviplaga insularis Allard, 74, p. 11
 Genyodonta laeviplaga perflavoapicalis Allard, 74, p. 11
 Genyodonta lequeuxi insulana Allard, 78, p. 5
 Genyodonta palliata collinsi Allard, 78, p. 5
 Genyodonta palliata werneri Allard, 78, p. 4
 Glycyphana (Glycyphaniola) allardi Antoine, 75-76, p. 10
 Glycyphana (Glycyphaniola) chamnongi Antoine, 69, p. 12
 Glycyphana (Glycyphaniola) malayensis ornata Antoine, 69, p. 12
 Gnathocarabus Deuve, 69, p. 4
 Gnathocera pauliani Allard, 60, p. 9
 Gnorimus octopunctatus flavopilosus Devecis, 74, p. 2
 Gnorimus octopunctatus hyperalba Devecis, 74, p. 2
 Goliathopsis duponti Antoine, 69, p. 10
 Goliathopsis ferreroi Antoine, 69, p. 10
 Heteropseudinca lequeuxi Legrand, 77, p. 34
 Hemiprotaetia boudanti Antoine, 75-76, p. 29
 Hexarthrius nigritus Lacroix, 65, 12
 Howdenypa Arnaud, 78, p. 28
 Homothyrea cinctipennis werneri Antoine, 79, p. 26
 Imaibiodes Deuve, 70, p. 20
 Ischnia okuensis miredoxa Téocchi, 60, p. 18
 Ischnostoma coetzeri Allard, 51, p. 25
 Ixorida (Aurelia) allardi Antoine, 82, p. 8
 Ixorida (Ixorida) florenti Arnaud, 62, p. 1
 Ixorida (Ixorida) heinrichi Antoine, 49, p. 11
 Ixorida (Mecinonota) chuai Antoine, 69, p. 16
 Ixorida (Mecinonota) decorata Antoine, 49, p. 11
 Ixorida (Mecinonota) inornata Antoine, 49, p. 12
 Ixorida (Mecinonota) kinabaluensis Antoine, 49, p. 11
 Ixorida (Mecinonota) luctuosa Antoine, 49, p. 12
 Ixorida (Mecinonota) nagaii Antoine, 75-76, p. 18
 Ixorida (Mecinonota) pseudoregia Antoine, 49, p. 14
 Ixorida (Mecinonota) pseudoregia borneensis Antoine, 49, p. 14
 Ixorida (Mecinonota) pseudoregia malayensis Antoine, 49, p. 14
 Ixorida (Mecinonota) regia allardi Antoine, 64, p. 9
 Ixorida (Mecinonota) regia siberutensis Antoine, 49, p. 14
 Ixorida (Mecinonota) sabatieri Antoine, 82, p. 10
 Ixorida (Mecinonota) salomonica tulagiensis Antoine, 49, p. 16
 Ixorida (Mecinonota) venera siamensis Antoine, 49, p. 15
 Ixorida (Pseudomecinonota) acutipennis Antoine, 49, p. 14
 Ixorida (Pseudomecinonota) confusa Antoine, 75-76, p. 18
 Ixorida (Pseudomecinonota) gueyraudi Antoine, 75-76, p. 18
 Ixorida (Pseudomecinonota) gueyraudiana Antoine, 75-76, p. 19
 Jumnos ferreroiminettique Antoine, 72, p. 18
 Kerochariesthes Téocchi, 64, p. 19
 Leucocellis coerulescens erythraeana Antoine, 79, p. 25
 Lucanus ritae Lacroix, 40, p. 10
 Macrodontia cambeforti Bleuzen, 67, p. 9
 Macrodontia marechali Bleuzen, 67, p. 9
 Mausoleopsis amabilis ruteri Antoine, 64, p. 8
 Megacriodes albinicans Devecis, 66, p. 18
 Megacriodes herbuloti Devecis, 79, p. 27
 Megalorrhina harrisi eximioides Allard, 59, p. 26
 Megalorrhina harrisi leptofurcosa Allard, 47, p. 1
 Megalorrhina taverniersi Allard, 66, p. 21
 Melinesthes jocquei Allard, 60, p. 12
 Melinesthes lequeuxi Allard, 60, p. 12
 Melinesthes murphyi Allard, 60, p. 12
 Metaxymorpha imitator Sainval, 81, p. 23
 Metaxymorpha nigrosuturalis Sainval & Lander, 79, p. 8
 Metaxymorpha regale blairi Sainval & Lander, 81, p. 24
 Mycteristes (Cephalocosmus) minettii Antoine, 69, p. 14
 Obera discoidalis togoensis Téocchi, 74, p. 15
 Neofreocorus Téocchi, 58, p. 18
 Neofreocorus novaki Téocchi, 58, p. 18
 Neolucanus zebra Lacroix, 59, p. 5
 Nigidius cartereti Bomans & Bartolozzi, 72, p. 5
 Nigidius inouei Bomans & Bartolozzi, 72, p. 7
 Nigracoptolabrus Deuve, 70, p. 18
 Nitocris delecta rufoscapula Téocchi, 64, p. 21
 Nitocris juvenca capinera Téocchi, 64, p. 21
 Nitocris microphtalma rossii Téocchi, 74, p. 15
 Nyctopais jordani balteata Téocchi, 60, p. 25
 Obereopsis obscuritarsis infuscatus Téocchi, 64, p. 22
 Odontolabis femoralis palawanicus Lacroix, 65, 13
 Oncosterna celebensis nigripilosa Antoine, 75-76, p. 19
 Oncosterna friderici thiburcei Antoine, 75-76, p. 19
 Ontochariestes Téocchi, 74, p. 12
 Oxythyrea (Acheilosis) canui Antoine, 58, p. 19
 Oxythyrea (Acheilosis) decellei Antoine, 53, p. 18
 Oxythyrea (Acheilosis) fuscoaenea Antoine, 53, p. 16
 Oxythyrea (Acheilosis) intermedia Antoine, 53, p. 16
 Oxythyrea (Acheilosis) maraisi Antoine, 56, p. 22
 Oxythyrea (Acheilosis) pauliani Antoine, 53, p. 18
 Oxythyrea (Acheilosis) septicollis Antoine, 53, p. 17
 Oxythyrea congoensis Antoine, 75-76, p. 12
 Oxythyrea pouillaudei Antoine, 58, p. 20
 Oxythyrea triliturata basilewskyi Antoine, 75-76, p. 14
 Oxythyrea viossati Antoine, 58, p. 19
 Pachnoda ardoini lydiae Rigout, 53, p. 27
 Pachnoda arrowi cludtsi Rigout, 50, p. 2
 Pachnoda arrowi kivuensis Rigout, 50, p. 2
 Pachnoda berliozi Rigout, 24, p. 2
 Pachnoda chireyi Legrand, 77, p. 34
 Pachnoda collinsi Rigout, 46, p. 5
 Pachnoda concolor schuerhoffi Rigout, 43, p. 2
 Pachnoda cordata camerounensis Rigout, 44 p. 13
 Pachnoda cordata dahomeyana Rigout, 46, p. 5
 Pachnoda dargei Rigout, 53, p. 27
 Pachnoda dechambrei Rigout, 50, p. 1
 Pachnoda demoulini Rigout, 17, p. 2
 Pachnoda collinsi Rigout, 46, p. 5
 Pachnoda fromenti Rigout, 29-30, p. 52
 Pachnoda hilaroides Rigout, 43, p. 2
 Pachnoda leclercqi Rigout, 46, p. 4
 Pachnoda leclercqi nigricans Rigout, 46, p. 4
 Pachnoda lequeuxi Rigout, 21, p. 11
 Pachnoda lerui Rigout, 64, p. 18
 Pachnoda madgei Rigout, 83, p. 8
 Pachnoda marginata murielae Rigout, 53, p. 27
 Pachnoda nutricia Rigout, 26, p. 15
 Pachnoda onorei Rigout, 26, p. 17
 Pachnoda poggei bourgeati Rigout, 26, p. 18
 Pachnoda praecellens mateui Rigout, 26, p. 15
 Pachnoda praecellens nigrescens Rigout, 26, p. 15
 Pachnoda rougemonti Rigout, 43, p. 3
 Pachnoda sinuata nicolae Rigout, 53, p. 28
 Pachnoda trimaculata turlini Rigout, 21, p. 10
 Pachnoda trimaculata turlini immaculata Rigout, 21, p. 11
 Pachnoda trimaculata turlini separata Rigout, 21, p. 11
 Pachnoda watulegei Rigout, 29-30, p. 52
 Panglaphyra bougainvillei Allard, 61, p. 3
 Panglaphyra lamondi Allard, 61, p. 3
 Panglaphyra robusta Allard, 61, p. 3
 Paraleucosma Antoine, 64, p. 4
 Paraleucosma glycuphanoides dives Antoine, 64, p. 5
 Paraphloeus scortecci eytreensis Téocchi, 74, p. 14
 Parepixanthis gueyraudi Antoine, 82, p. 5
 Paraplagiomus tragiscoides sexplagiata Téocchi, 63, p. 10
 Phaedimus howdeni Arnaud, 53, p. 4
 Phaedimus lumawigi Arnaud, 64, p. 25
 Phytoecia (Blepisanis) sublateralis rubroscapa Téocchi, 63, p. 12
 Plaesiorrhina watkinsiana kolbeii Allard, 78, p. 4
 Planodema bimaculata rhomphae Téocchi, 57, p. 19
 Platygeniops guttatus Ricchiardi, 77, p. 8
 Platynocephalus arnaudi Delpont, 83, p. 31
 Platynocephalus miyashitai Delpont, 83, p. 31
 Plectrone malvari Antoine, 75-76, p. 31
 Plectrone romeoi Arnaud, 56, p. 27
 Pleuronota allardi Antoine, 67, p. 26
 Pleuronota chuai Antoine, 67, p. 26
 Pleuronota lumawigi Arnaud, 66, p. 8
 Plusiotis dzidorhum Arnaud, 82, p. 36
 Poimenesperus dobrai reducta Téocchi, 78, p. 38
 Polyphylla (Granida) jessopi Wailly, 80, p. 12
 Polyphylla (Granida) nikodymi Wailly, 80, p. 13
 Potosia fieberi barilloti Devecis, 74, p. 3
 Potosia fieberi dumasi Devecis, 74, p. 3
 Prosopocera (Alphitopola) allardi Téocchi, 79, p. 29
 Prosopocera (Alphitopola) forchhammeriana maculicollis Téocchi, 60, p. 8
 Prosopocera (Alphitopola) gracillima mourgliai Téocchi, 79, p. 29
 Prosopocera (Alphitopola) gracillima werneri Téocchi, 79, p. 29
 Prosopocera (Alphitopola) pyrgopolynica brunneipennis Téocchi, 60, p. 7
 Prosopocera (Alphitopola) pyrgopolynica lunulata Téocchi, 60, p. 7
 Prosopocera (Alphitopola) subocellata nigrocellata Téocchi, 72, p. 10
 Prosopocera (Paralphitopola) maculosa formosa Téocchi, 72, p. 10
 Prosopocoelus chalcoides Lacroix & Ratti, 38, p. 2
 Prosopocoelus erberi Lacroix, 57, p. 8
 Prosopocoelus fabricei Lacroix, 57, p. 10
 Prosopocoelus francisi Arnaud, 53, p. 4
 Prosopocoelus gertrudae Arnaud & Lacroix, 69, p. 25
 Prosopocoelus ipseni Lacroix, 57, p. 12
 Prosopocoelus khooi Lacroix, 38, p. 2
 Prosopocoelus marioni Arnaud & Lacroix, 69, p. 25
 Prosopocoelus romeoi Lacroix & Taroni, 38, p. 3
 Prosopocoelus taroni Lacroix & Ratti, 38, p. 4
 Prosopocoelus vittatus francisi Arnaud & Lacroix, 69, p. 25
 Prosopocoelus zebra ledae Lacroix & Taroni, 38, p. 5
 Protaetia (Euprotaetia) gertrudae Arnaud, 64, p. 3
 Protaetia (Euprotaetia) lumawigi Arnaud, 53, p. 4
 Protaetia (Euprotaetia) teisseyrei Arnaud, 64, p. 24
 Protaetia (Euprotaetia) uhligi Arnaud, 53, p. 4
 Protaetia (Liocola) chicheryi Antoine, 69, p. 11
 Protaetia (Pachyprotaetia) chaminadei Antoine, 69, p. 11
 Protaetia (Poecilophana) audreyae Arnaud, 64, p. 23
 Protaetia (Potosia) paulianiana Antoine, 64, p. 6
 Protaetia (Protaetia) allardi Antoine, 82, p. 6
 Protaetia (Protaetia) antoinei Arnaud, 64, p. 24
 Protaetia (Protaetia) boudanti Antoine, 75-76, p. 29
 Protaetia (Protaetia) boulleti Arnaud, 62, p. 1
 Protaetia (Protaetia) francisi Arnaud, 62, p. 2
 Protaetia (Protaetia) gueyraudi Antoine, 82, p. 6
 Protaetia (Protaetia) ismaeli Arnaud, 56, p. 27
 Protaetia (Protaetia) johani Antoine, 75-76, p. 30
 Protaetia (Protaetia) miksici Arnaud, 53, p. 4 (nomen preoc.)
 Protaetia (Protaetia) pavicevici Antoine, 75-76, p. 29
 Protaetia (Macroprotetia) milani Antoine, 82, p. 13
 Pseudochalcotheomima allardi Antoine, 68, p. 6
 Pseudochalcotheomima compacta Antoine, 68, p. 6
 Pseudochariestes arrowi murphyi Téocchi, 63, p. 9
 Pseudochariestes francoisi decempunctata Téocchi, 68, p. 27 (and 74, p. 13)
 Pseudochariestes picta ruahae Téocchi, 72, p. 9
 Pseudochariestes tricolor trichroma Téocchi, 68, p. 27
 Pseudolucanus deuvei Lacroix, 57, p. 7
 Pseudolucanus wittmeri Lacroix, 40, 7
 Pseudoheterophana Allard, 68, p. 22
 Pseudoheterophana canui Allard, 68, p. 22
 Pseudotephraea ancilla canui Antoine, 75-76, p. 12
 Pterostichus keltiekus Morvan, 29-30, p. 15
 Pterostichus pseudoharmandi Morvan, 29-30, p. 16
 Pterotragula Téocchi, 72, p. 11
 Rosenbergia breuningi Rigout, 34, p. 1
 Rosenbergia chicheryi Rigout, 28, p. 22
 Rosenbergia drouini Rigout, 75-76, p. 78
 Rosenbergia erhmanae Rigout, 42, p. 14
 Rosenbergia freneyi Rigout, 58, p. 4
 Rosenbergia hlaveki Rigout, 75-76, p. 78
 Rosenbergia hoyoisi Rigout, 75-76, p. 78
 Rosenbergia lislei Rigout, 28, p. 21
 Rosenbergia lislei noeli Rigout, 29-30, p. 20
 Rosenbergia schmitti Rigout, 28, p. 22
 Rosenbergia schneideri Rigout, 82, p. 4
 Sarathropezus conicipennis allardi Téocchi, 62, p. 26
 Serrognathus coifaisi Lacroix, 40, p. 13
 Serrognathus lumawigorum Arnaud & Lacroix, 69, p. 25
 Serrognathus moinieri Lacroix, 40, p. 16
 Serrognathus titanus palawanicus Lacroix, 40, p. 17
 Smaragdesthes conjux cedrici Allard, 59, p. 27
 Sophronica ikutensis latefasciata Téocchi, 72, p. 14
 Sophronica suturalis unicolor Téocchi, 72, p. 14
 Sophronica vittata Téocchi, 70, p. 28
 Sphaenognathinus Chalumeau & Brochier, 83, p. 20
 Sphaenognathus cartereti Lacroix, 56, 11
 Sphaenognathus furumii Lacroix, 65, 11
 Sphaenognathus lachaumei Lacroix, 40, 5
 Sphaenognathus leoni Lacroix, 40, 7
 Sphaenognathus rotundatus Lacroix, 56, 12
 Sphaenognathus subtilis Lacroix, 56, 13
 Spinocentruropsis Minet, 55, p. 21
 Spinocentruropsis papuanus Minet, 55, p. 21
 Stephanocrates dohertyi namangensis Allard, 46, p. 17
 Stephanocrates kiellandi Allard, 46, p. 16
 Stephanorrhina guttata insularis Allard, 59, p. 26
 Stephanorrhina isabellae Allard, 67, p. 23
 Stephanorrhina princeps bamptoni Allard, 43, p. 7
 Stephanorrhina princeps kigonsera Allard, 43, p. 7
 Stenauxa fasciata anterufa Téocchi, 72, p. 11
 Sternoplus chicheryiana Antoine, 75-76, p. 10
 Sternotomis bohemanni scholtzi Téocchi, 57, p. 17
 Sternotomis itzingeri viridiana Téocchi, 74, p. 13
 Strategus monguilloni Voirin, 21, p. 9
 Taeniesthes collinsi Allard, 74, p. 11
 Tetradia lophoptera postalba Téocchi, 72, p. 14
 Thaumastopeus rubyi Arnaud, 46, p. 18
 Thylactus kinduensis ferreroi Téocchi, 63, p. 12
 Tmesorrhina alpestris bafutensis Darge, 59, p. 25
 Tmesorrhina garnieri Allard, 78, p. 4
 Tmesorrhina laeta pseudotridens Allard, 78, p. 4
 Tmesorrhina latea oilosipes Allard, 59, p. 27
 Tmesorrhina lequeuxi Antoine, 83, p. 27
 Tmesorrhina simillima viridipes Allard, 59, p. 27
 Tragocephala mima bopprei Téocchi, 74, p. 13
 Tragocephala mista minettii Téocchi, 72, p. 9
 Tragocephala mnizechi dargei Téocchi, 64, p. 20
 Tragocephala variegata bellamyi Téocchi, 72, p. 9
 Trichius lianae Ricchiardi, 77, p. 5
 Trichius obscurus Ricchiardi, 77, p. 6
 Typocaeta kenyana Téocchi, 72, p. 11
 Uloptera canui Antoine, 75-76, p. 16
 Zographus oculator conjuctus Téocchi, 57, p. 18

Lepidoptera (butterflies and moths)

 Acraea kia Pierre, 68, p. 1
 Adelotypa aminias wia Brévignon & Gallard, 73, p. 6
 Adelotypa balista augustalis Brévignon, 77, p. 24
 Adelpha celerio florea Brévignon, 83, p. 17
 Adelpha epione galbao Brévignon, 83, p. 17
 Adelpha gilletta Brévignon, 83, p. 17
 Agrias claudina sardanapalus paganinii Späth, 75-76, p. 42
 Agrias narcissus tapajonus kersteini Späth, 75-76, p. 39
 Agrias narcissus tapajonus werneri Späth, 75-76, p. 39
 Agrias phalcidon fournierae mariettae Späth, 75-76, p. 39
 Anaea titan romeroi Descimon, 58, p. 16
 Anteros aurigans Gallard & Brévignon, 63, p. 5
 Bonagota Razowski, 52, p. 22
 Callicore cyllene lalannensis Brévignon, 83, p. 16
 Calospila rhodope wayanai Brévignon, 77, p. 24
 Charaxes ansorgei simoni Turlin, 53, p. 19
 Charaxes brutus roberti Turlin, 53, p. 20
 Charaxes eudoxus boersmana Plantrou, 26, p. 12
 Charaxes lucyae gabriellae Turlin, 54, p. 7
 Charaxes druceanus brazza Turlin, 53, p. 23
 Charaxes galleyanus Darge & Minig, 44, p. 7
 Charaxes kheili caeruleolinea Basquin & Turlin, 52, p. 2
 Charaxes kheili curvilinea Basquin & Turlin, 52, p. 1
 Charaxes kheili flavimaculata Basquin & Turlin, 52, p. 2
 Charaxes matakall Darge, 47, p. 9
 Charaxes matakall collinsianus Darge, 47, p. 13
 Charaxes matakall fabiennae Darge, 47, p. 13
 Charaxes matakall franceoisixavieri Darge, 47, p. 13
 Charaxes matakall smaragdaliformis Darge, 47, p. 13
 Charaxes nicati Canu, 72, p. 22
 Charaxes pembanus coelestissima Turlin, 53, p. 24
 Charaxes pleione delvauxi Turlin, 53, p. 21
 Charaxes teissieri Darge & Minig, 44, p. 7
 Charaxes viossati Canu, 72, p. 22
 Charaxes zoolina mafugensis kivu Turlin, 25, p. 16
 Charaxes zoolina mafugensis winka Turlin, 25, p. 16
 Coelonia mauritii nigrescens Basquin, 75-76, p. 47
 Delias bouyssoui Schmitt, 75-76, p. 69
 Delias dollyae Schmitt, 75-76, p. 68
 Delias festone Schmitt, 75-76, p. 71
 Delias giseleae Schmitt, 75-76, p. 69
 Delias ibelana roepkei Schmitt, 75-76, p. 70
 Delias jordani Schmitt, 75-76, p. 71
 Dynaminae pebana elisa Brévignon, 83, p. 16
 Enantia aloikea Brévignon, 77, p. 17
 Esthemopsis crystallina Brévignon & Gallard, 73, p. 4
 Eupithecia anamnesa Herbulot, 81, p. 21
 Eupanacra hogenesi Haxaire, 80, p. 1
 Eupithecia drastica Herbulot, 81, p. 22
 Eupithecia fastuosa Herbulot, 81, p. 19
 Eupithecia pippoides Herbulot, 81, p. 19
 Eupithecia rigouti Herbulot, 81, p. 19
 Eurema elathea lamasi Brévignon, 77, p. 17
 Euselasia eubotes matouryensis Brévignon & Gallard, 77, p. 20
 Euselasia euodias talidiman Brévignon & Gallard, 73, p. 3
 Euselasia eubotes matouryensis Brévignon & Gallard, 77, p. 20
 Euselasia urites eglawahe Brévignon & Gallard, 77, p. 20
 Godyris zavaleta eutelina Brévignon, 77, p. 19
 Graphium antheus atrantheus Basquin & Turlin, 51, p. 1
 Graphium stratiodes striarubra Sala, 75-76, p. 35
 Hippotion psammochroma Basquin, 62, p. 14
 Holocerina basquini Darge, 50, p. 27
 Hypocrita simulatrix Toulgoët, 81, p. 28
 Hyposcada anchiala gallardi dujardini Brévignon, 80, p. 28
 Hyposcada illinissa dujardini Brévignon, 80, p. 27
 Lycaena pang weissi Bozano, 77, p. 25
 Pyrrhogyra amphiro agilis Brévignon, 83, p. 14
 Pyrrhogyra stratonicus matthias Brévignon, 83, p. 14
 Melander thalassicus Brévignon & Gallard, 73, p. 5
 Melanocera dargei Terral, 70, p. 14
 Melanocera widenti Terral & Darge, 70, p. 16
 Mesene mahurya Brévignon, 77, p. 20
 Mesene silaris maroni Brévignon, 77, p. 21
 Mesosemia esmeralda Gallard & Brévignon, 62, p. 12
 Micragone plitzari Basquin, 62, p. 14
 Morpho amphitryon cinereus Duchêne, 48, p. 25
 Morpho amphitryon duponti Duchêne, 62, p. 15
 Nymphidium fulmigans guyanensis Gallard & Brévignon, 63, p. 4
 Olepa anomi Orhant, 50, p. 11
 Olepa duboisi Orhant, 50, p. 11
 Olepa koslandana Orhant, 50, p. 12
 Olepa toulgoeti Orhant, 50, p. 13
 Oleria astrea chloris Lamas & Brévignon, 80, p. 29
 Oleria onega hermieri Brévignon, 80, p. 31
 Oleria sexmaculata saulensis Brévignon, 80, p. 30
 Ornithoptera (Ornithoptera) croesus wallacei Deslisle, 71, p. 5
 Orthogonioptilum adiegetum bafutensis Darge, 57, p. 22
 Orthogonioptilum adiegetum mucronatum Darge, 57, p. 23
 Orthogonioptilum adiegetum neodollmani Darge, 57, p. 23
 Orthogonioptilum adiegetum pseudadiegetum Darge, 57, p. 22
 Orthogonioptilum adiegetum restrictum Darge, 57, p. 21
 Orthogonioptilum adiegetum ugandensis Darge, 57, p. 23
 Orthogonioptilum apium Basquin, 83, p. 10
 Orthogonioptilum crystallinum Darge, 79, p. 20
 Orthogonioptilum dargei Basquin, 75-76, p. 49
 Orthogonioptilum emmanuellae Basquin, 83, p. 9
 Orthogonioptilum galleyi Basquin, 75-76, p. 50
 Orthogonioptilum loloense Basquin, 83, p. 10
 Orthogonioptilum perarcuatum Darge, 79, p. 21
 Orthogonioptilum sejunctum Darge, 79, p. 20
 Orthogonioptilum umbrulatum Basquin, 83, p. 10
 Panacea bleuzeni Plantrou & Attal, 50, p. 23
 Papilio aegeus demoi Sala, 75-76, p. 34
 Papilio aegeus marioi Sala, 75-76, p. 34
 Papilio phorca congoanus ponzonii Sala, 75-76, p. 35
 Papilio nireus cedeae Sala, 75-76, p. 35
 Papilio isidorus pseudoflavescens Sala, 75-76, p. 35
 Papilio rumanzovia moscai Sala, 75-76, p. 35
 Parnassius acco goergneri Weiss & Michel, 61, p. 13
 Parnassius acco rosea Weiss & Michel, 61, p. 13
 Parnassius acdestis cerevisiae Weiss & Michel, 61, p. 15
 Parnassius acdestis imperatoides Weiss & Michel, 61, p. 15
 Parnassius acdestis limitis Weiss & Michel, 61, p. 14
 Parnassius actius lahulensis Weiss, 68, p. 12
 Parnassius apollonius werneri Weiss, 68, p. 12
 Parnassius boedromius marcopolo Weiss, 82, p. 37
 Parnassius cephalus dengxiaoping Weiss & Michel, 61, p. 5
 Parnassius cephalus shinkaii Weiss, 69, p. 1
 Parnassius delphius pensi Eisner & Weiss, 68, p. 9
 Parnassius epaphus rienki Eisner & Weiss, 68, p. 10
 Parnassius imperator jiyetiani Pierrat, 67, p. 5
 Parnassius imperator karmapa Weiss & Michel, 61, p. 15
 Parnassius labeyriei Weiss & Michel, 61, p. 7
 Parnassius labeyriei giacomazzoi Weiss, 70, p. 9
 Parnassius priamus meveli Weiss & Michel, 61, p. 14
 Parnassius przewalskii humboldti Pierrat & Porion, 59, p. 1
 Parnassius schultei Weiss & Michel, 61, p. 5
 Parnassius simo kangruensis Eisner & Weiss, 68, p. 8
 Perisana affinis Crosson du Cormier & Attal, 83, p. 35
 Polyptychus barnsi Darge, 65, p. 8
 Polyptychus distensus Darge, 65, p. 10
 Polyptychus herbuloti Darge, 65, p. 9
 Polyptychus potiendus Darge, 65, p. 8
 Rebinea Razowski, 52, p. 22
 Ripponia hypolitus sulaensis semimasculata Deslisle, 71, p. 4
 Roeberella flocculus Brévignon & Gallard, 77, p. 22
 Seticosta Razowski, 52, p. 22
 Symmachia miron pulchellita Brévignon & Gallard, 73, p. 5
 Symmachia seducta Brévignon, 77, p. 21
 Symmachia seducta Brévignon, 77, p. 21
 Teinopalpus aureus eminens Turlin, 70, p. 6
 Teinopalpus imperialis imperialis kabruana Turlin, 70, p. 4
 Teinopalpus imperialis gillesi Turlin, 70, p. 4
 Theope galionicus Gallard & Brévignon, 63, p. 5
 Thisbe fenestrella cayennensis Brévignon & Gallard, 73, p. 5
 Troides darcius clementinae Sala, 75-76, p. 34
 Troides darcius donae Sala, 75-76, p. 34
 Troides helena dempoensis Deslisle, 80, p. 33
 Troides helena rayae Deslisle, 71, p. 2
 Troides miranda annae Deslisle, 59, p. 9
 Uelia Razowsky, 34, p. 3
 Uelia sepidapex Razowsky, 34, p. 3
 Usta grantae Terral & Lequeux, 70, p. 14
 Vila carmenae Le Crom, 65, 15
 Zelotaea alba Gallard & Brévignon, 63, p. 4
 Zelotaea suffusca Brévignon & Gallard, 77, p. 23
 Zerynthia polyxena polyxena diabolica Schulte & Weiss, 69, p. 2
 Zerynthia rumina rumina branesae Rivoire, 75-76, p. 34

Hymenoptera (sawflies, wasps, bees, and ants)

 Scolia (Scolia) hortorum nouveli Hamon, 74, p. 17

Arachnida (eight-legged invertebrates)

 Arachnocoris karukerae Lopez, 65, p. 3
 Argyrodes benedicti Lopez, 59, p. 20
 Argyrodes calmettei Lopez, 67, p. 19
 Argyrodes coactatus Lopez, 59, p. 17
 Argyrodes borbonicus Lopez, 67, p. 20
 Ogulnius hayoti Lopez, 81, p. 7

Issue dates 

 1: June 1972 (no exact date)
 2: December 1972 (no exact date)
 3: June 1973 (no exact date)
 4: December 1973 (no exact date)
 5: June 1974 (no exact date)
 6: December 1974 (no exact date)
 7: June 1975 (no exact date)
 8: August 1975 (no exact date)
 9: December 1975 (no exact date)
 10: April 1976 (no exact date)
 11: August 1976 (no exact date)
 12: December 1976 (no exact date)
 13: April 1977 (no exact date)
 14: June 1977 (no exact date)
 15: 15 October 1977
 16: 20 December 1977
 17: 8 February 1978
 18: 28 June 1978
 19: 6 October 1978
 20: 29 December 1978
 21: 9 April 1979
 22: 5 July 1979
 23: 15 October 1979
 24: 14 January 1980
 25: 25 April 1980
 26: 15 July 1980
 27: 18 October 1980
 28: 16 March 1981
 29-30: 22 July 1981
 31: 31 January 1982
 32: 25 May 1982
 33: 30 July 1982
 34: 10 December 1982
 35: 28 January 1983
 36: 31 May 1983
 37: 8 July 1983
 38: 30 August 1983
 39: 18 November 1983
 40: 29 February 1984
 41: 25 May 1984
 42: 25 May 1984
 43: 7 November 1984
 44: 14 November 1984
 45: 18 January 1985
 46: 30 April 1985
 47: 15 November 1985
 48: 15 November 1985
 49: 20 April 1986
 50: 22 September 1986
 51: 31 October 1986
 52: 28 November 1986
 53: 21 January 1987
 54: 15 April 1987
 55: 29 August 1987
 56: 31 December 1987
 57: 15 April 1988
 58: 30 June 1988
 59: 15 January 1989
 60: 19 January 1989
 61: 28 February 1989
 62: 30 June 1989
 63: 15 November 1989
 64: 15 December 1989
 65: 15 January 1990
 66: 20 June 1990
 67: 31 October 1990
 68: 20 December 1990
 69: 30 April 1991
 70: 31 July 1991
 71: 25 September 1991
 72: 18 November 1991
 73: 24 April 1992
 74: 3 July 1992
 75-76: 26 October 1992
 77: 26 March 1993
 78: 30 June 1993
 79: 25 October 1993
 80: 27 December 1993
 81: 1 April 1994
 82: 30 September 1994
 83: 15 May 1995

References

Bulletin de la Société Sciences Nat
Bulletin de la Société Sciences Nat